Daivathinte Makan is a 2000 Indian Malayalam-language action comedy film directed by Vinayan. It stars Jayaram, Prema, and Pooja Batra. The film was released in 2000.

Plot

Cast
Jayaram as Sunny
Prema as Anjali
Pooja Batra as Soniya
Jagathy Sreekumar as Thalassery Kunjambu
Kalabhavan Mani as Eeshwar
Rajan P. Dev as Aanakkaran Avarachan, Soniya's father
Janardhanan as Fr. Gabriel 
Hemanth Ravan as Rathan Bhai
Sai Kumar as Peter
Oduvil Unnikrishnan as Dr. Samuel
Augustine as Muthuswamy
Sadiq as Police Officer
Riyaz as Deepak
Vani Viswanath as Deepaks Sister
Kollam Ajith as Police Constable Ponnappan
Subair as Rathan Bhai's friend
Sumithra as Anjali's mother
Shivaji as Anjali's stepfather
Ponnamma Babu as Soniya's mother
Manka Mahesh as Subhadramma
Priyanka as Malathi

Box office
The film was a success.

References

2000 films
2000s Malayalam-language films
Films scored by Vidyasagar
Films directed by Vinayan